"I'm Tryna" is a song from American R&B singer Omarion. It was released on April 6, 2005 as the third and final single off his debut album O. It was produced by production team The Underdogs and written by R&B singer-songwriter J. Valentine. It also featured instrumentals by fellow American R&B singer Tank. A music video for the single, directed by frequent collaborator Chris Stokes, was made and featured Omarion looking back on his relationship with his ex-girlfriend (played by Danielle Polanco).

Music video
Directed by Chris Stokes (who previously directed the video for "O"), the video shows Omarion in his car waiting outside his ex-girlfriend's house. He reminisces about the times they spent together and how on two occasions of looking at another woman and answering his cell phone while making out irritated her and left him. He spots his ex-girlfriend with her new boyfriend (who resembles Omarion) as they enter her house. Omarion exits his car to enter her house and the video ends with "to be continued...". The ex-girlfriend is played by Danielle Polanco, who previously appeared in his video for "Touch".

Credits and personnel
Credits are adapted from the liner notes of O.
Recording
 Recorded and mixed at The Underlab, Los Angeles

Personnel
 The Underdogs – producer
 Dave "Natural Love" Russell – recording, editing, mixer
 Dablin "Hobby Boy" Howard – recording, editing
 Eric Dawkins – background vocals
 Durrell Babbs – background vocals
 Kevin Mahoney – assistant engineer

Chart

References 

2004 songs
2005 singles
Omarion songs
Epic Records singles
Song recordings produced by the Underdogs (production team)
Songs written by Harvey Mason Jr.
Songs written by J. Valentine
Songs written by Damon Thomas (record producer)
Songs written by Tank (American singer)